Deck Dorval is a pseudonym used by Frans van Dooren, Jef Beeckmans, and Jos Deckkers, for books published in Esperanto.

In their writing partnership, Van Dooren wrote, Jos Deckkers criticized and Jef Beeckmans corrected grammar and language.
Their forty-year friendship was based on their mutual interests in Esperanto, philosophy, and literature.

After the deaths of  Beeckmans (1975) and Deckkers (1979), their heirs gave van Dooren the right to finish works that the group had already been begun.

Works
Jahto veturas for ... kaj veturigas la morton

Collective pseudonyms
Writers of Esperanto literature